Chilkur (Chilkuru) is a census town in Suryapet district of the Indian state of Telangana.It is 50 km away from district headquarters Suryapet and Lies between Kodad and Huzurnagar..It is the headquarters of Chilkur mandal of Kodad revenue division.

Climate 
It is too Hot in summer. Chilkur summer highest day temperature is in between 35 °C to 48 °C . Average temperatures of January is 24 °C, February is 26 °C, March is 29 °C, April is 33 °C, May is 36 °C.

Demographics 
According to Census of India, 2011, population of Chilkur is 18,952 of which 9,578 are male and 9,374 are female. The literacy rate is 85.7%. Sex ratio is 986 females to 1000 males. Child sex ratio is 951 girls to 1000 boys.

Governance

Politics 
Chilkur is Mandal Headquarters  falls under Kodad (Assembly constituency) of Telangana Legislative Assembly.  Sri.Bollam Mallaiah Yadav is the present MLA of the constituency from TRS.

History 
Chilkur had some best pages in History.Chalukyas, Kakatiyas and Nizam dynasties ruled the region.

References

Cities and towns in Suryapet district
Mandal headquarters in Suryapet district